Calochilus holtzei, commonly known as the ghostly beard orchid, is a species of orchid endemic to northwestern Australia. It has a single leaf and up to twenty pale green to yellowish flowers with red markings and a labellum with a greenish "beard".

Description
The lateral sepals are a similar length but narrower. The base of the labellum has purple calli and two purple plates. Flowering occurs from December to March but each flower only lasts two or three days.

Taxonomy and naming
Calochilus holtzei was first formally described in 1892 by Ferdinand von Mueller and the description was published in The Victorian Naturalist from specimens collected near Port Darwin by Maurice William Holtze. The specific epithet (holtzei) honours the collector of the type specimen.

Distribution and habitat
The ghostly beard orchid grows with grasses in forest and woodland in the northern Kimberley region of Western Australia and on Melville Island in the Northern Territory.

References

holtzei
Orchids of the Northern Territory
Orchids of Western Australia
Plants described in 1892
Taxa named by Ferdinand von Mueller